These are munition workers who died of TNT poisoning during the manufacture of ammunition for the front lines of World War I. Working with TNT caused many health issues, commonly called TNT poisoning, the most serious of which was a liver disease called toxic jaundice. According to historian Anne Spurgeon, during the First World War, there were 400 cases of the disease of which about 100 were fatal. Munition workers were sometimes called Canary Girls, British women who worked in munitions manufacturing trinitrotoluene (TNT) shells during the First World War1 (1914–1918). The nickname arose because exposure to TNT is toxic, and repeated exposure can turn the skin an orange-yellow colour reminiscent of the plumage of a canary.

Effects of working with TNT 
Shells were filled with a mixture of TNT (the explosive) and cordite (the propellant), and even though these ingredients were known to be hazardous to health, they were mixed by hand so came into direct contact with the workers' skin. The chemicals in the TNT reacted with melanin in the skin to cause a yellow pigmentation, staining the skin of the munitions workers. Although unpleasant, this specific side effect was not dangerous and the discolouration eventually faded over time with no long-term health effects.

A more serious consequence of working with TNT powder was liver toxicity, which led to anaemia and jaundice. This condition, known as "toxic jaundice", gave the skin a different type of yellow hue.

A medical investigation was carried out by the government in 1916, to closely study the effects of TNT on the munitions workers. The investigators were able to gather their data by acting as female medical officers posted inside the factories. They found that the effects of the TNT could be roughly split into two areas: irritative symptoms, mainly affecting the skin, respiratory tract, and digestive system; and toxic symptoms, including nausea, jaundice, constipation, dizziness, etc.  It is possible that the irritative symptoms were also partly caused by the cordite in the shell mixture, although this was not established until years later.

Partial list of those killed by TNT poisoning

Bibliography 
Notes

References
 
 
  - Total pages: 502 
 

British women in World War I
Ammunition manufacturers